The Meritorious Public Service Medal formerly the Outstanding Civilian Service Award is the third highest honor within the public service awards scheme of the Department of the Army that can be awarded to a private citizen.

Eligibility
The Secretary of the Army or a major commander may award this medal to eligible recipients, including civilians not employed by the Army or Army contractors (who are eligible for Army honorary awards), military personnel, Federal Government officials at the policy development level, and technical personnel who serve the Army in an advisory capacity or as consultant, for "outstanding service that makes a substantial contribution or is of significance to the Major Command concerned."

Criteria
The Secretary of the Army or a major commander may award this medal for outstanding service that makes a substantial contribution or is of significance to the major Army command concerned. Commanders of Major Army commands may delegate approval authority for this award to any commander in the rank of Major General or above.

Appearance
On the obverse is an equilateral triangle symbolic of the civilian. Superimposed on the triangle is the eagle from the Great Seal of the United States. At the base of the medal is a wreath denoting nonmilitary service. The reverse of the medal is inscribed AWARDED TO and FOR MERITORIOUS PUBLIC SERVICE TO THE UNITED STATES ARMY.

The medal is suspended by a ribbon  in width consisting of 13 alternating stripes equally spaced, seven white and six red.

Notable recipients 
 William Atwater - author and former Director of the United States Army Ordnance Museum
 BG Albert Bryant, Jr., USA (Ret.)
 E.N.J. Carter - creator of the "Be All You Can Be" slogan
 Stephen Colbert - TV talk show host for his continued support of U.S. troops
 Paul Fiset, M.D., Ph.D. - Armed Forces Epidemiological Board 19651976 and consultant to the Surgeon General
 SMA Richard A. Kidd, USA (Ret.) - former Sergeant Major of the Army
 Captain David Minard, M.D., Ph.D., M.P.H., MC USN - Mercury Seven heat stress physiologist for Project Mercury
 Audie Murphy - most decorated US Army soldier in World War II 
 Francis Joseph Murray - Mathematician known for his foundational work on functional analysis
 Mark Pfeifle - former Deputy National Security Advisor for Strategic Communications and Global Outreach under President George W. Bush.
 Elihu Rose - military historian 
 Thomas Fisher - Missile Defense Agency, awarded for meritorious achievement while serving in Area Support Group-Afghanistan 2019-2020.
 Bud Selig - former Commissioner of Major League Baseball for MLB's support of veterans and their families.
 Gary Sinise - Hon. CPO, USN - for substantial contributions to the U.S. Army community through his work with the Gary Sinise Foundation
 Emil Skodon - former United States Ambassador to Brunei and a career foreign service officer
 Jay Luvaas – military historian

See also 
Department of the Army Civilian Awards
Awards and decorations of the United States government

References 

Awards and decorations of the United States Department of Defense